Vidin (Old Romanian: Diiu) is a port city on the southern bank of the Danube in north-western Bulgaria. It is close to the borders with Romania and Serbia, and is also the administrative centre of Vidin Province, as well as of the Metropolitan of Vidin (since 870).

An agricultural and trade centre, Vidin has a fertile hinterland renowned for its wines.

Name 
The name is archaically spelled as Widdin in English. Old name Dunonia itself meant "fortified hill" in Celtic with the typically dun found frequently in Celtic place names.

Geography 
Vidin is the westernmost important Bulgarian Danube port and is situated on one of the southernmost sections of the river. The New Europe Bridge, completed in 2013, connects Vidin to the Romanian town of Calafat on the opposite bank of the Danube.

Climate
Vidin has a humid subtropical climate close to a temperate continental climate, from which it is shifting further and further away due to global warming. In the winter months, inversions are very common.

History 
Vidin emerged at the place of an old Celtic settlement known as Dunonia. The settlement evolved into a Roman fortified town called Bononia. The town grew into one of the important centres of the province of Upper Moesia, encompassing the territory of modern north-western Bulgaria and eastern Serbia.

When Slavs settled in the area, they called the town Badin or Bdin, where the modern name comes from. Similarly, Anna Komnene refers to it as Vidynē (Βιδύνη) in the Alexiad.

Vidin's main landmark, the Baba Vida fortress, was built in the period from the 10th to the 14th century. In the Middle Ages Vidin used to be an important Bulgarian city, a bishop seat and capital of a large province. Between 971 and 976 the town was the center of Samuil's possessions while his brothers ruled to the south. In 1003 Vidin was seized by Basil II after an eight-month siege because of the betrayal of the local bishop. Its importance once again rose during the Second Bulgarian Empire (1185–1422) and its despots were influential figures in the Empire and were on several occasions chosen for Emperors. From the mid 13th century it was ruled by the Shishman family.

By early 1290s Serbia expanded towards the vicinity of Vidin. Threatened by Serbian expansion, Shishman failed to repel the brothers forces, and accepted Serbian suzerainty. In practice, Shishman continued to be largely independent and dealt mainly with Bulgaria. Serbian suzerainty lasted until Serbian king Stefan Milutin´s death, in 1321. As Milutin left no testament, after his death, in Serbia occurred a period of civil war with Stefan Dečanski, Stefan Konstantin and Stefan Vladislav II fighting for power. Shishman took advantage of this situation, set free from Serbian rule, and returned to the Bulgarian sphere. In 1323 Shishman was chosen to be the Bulgarian tsar. Shishman made an anti-Serbian treaty with the Byzantines, however, after Serbian victory over Bulgarians in the Battle of Velbazhd in 1330, Bulgaria lay militarily crippled and politically subordinated to Serbia's interests.

In 1356, Bulgarian Tsar Ivan Alexander isolated Vidin from the Bulgarian monarchy and appointed his son Ivan Stratsimir (1356–1396) as absolute ruler of Vidin's new city-state - the Tsardom of Vidin (Bdin / Badin).

Hungarian occupation of Vidin 

In 1365, the Tsardom of Vidin was occupied by Magyar crusaders. Under Hungarian rule, the city became known as Bodony, but the occupation was short-lived. In 1369, the Second Bulgarian empire drove out the Hungarian military, but in 1396 Vidin was occupied by a foreign force again.

The Ottomans 

The Ottomans went on to conquer the despotates of Dobrudzha, Prilep and Velbazhd as well. Vidin's independence did not last long. In 1396, the Ottomans invaded and turned Vidin into a sandjak.

In the late years of Ottoman rule, Vidin was the centre of Turkish rebel Osman Pazvantoğlu's breakaway state.

In 1853, The Times of London reported that Widdin, as it was called, was

a considerable town, with a population of about 26,000, and a garrison of 8,000 to 10,000 men. Widdin is one of the important fortified places of the military line of the Danube. It covers the approaches of Servia, commands Little Wallachia, the defiles of Transylvania, and, above all, the opening of the road which leads through Nissia and Sophia on to Adrianople. Its form is an irregular pentagon; it is strongly bastioned, possesses a fortified castle, with two redoubts in the islands, and its defences are completed by an extensive marsh.

In 1859 the English traveler Samuel Baker happened to visit Vidin and spotted the 14-year old Florence Barbara Maria von Sass from Transylvania (then in Hungary now in Romania) being sold into slavery, by some accounts destined to be owned by the Pasha of Vidin. Baker bribed her guards and took her with him, she eventually became Florence Baker, his wife and partner in the exploration of Africa 
.

Modern rule
During the Serbo-Bulgarian War (1885), the town was besieged by a Serbian army.

Population
Vidin is the 20th town by population in Bulgaria, but serious demographic problems have been experienced in the area during the last two decades. The number of the residents of the city reached its peak between 1988 and 1991 when the population exceeded 65,000. As of 2011, the town had a population of 48,071 inhabitants and 40,422 inhabitants as of 2021. The following table presents the change of the population after 1887.

Ethnic, linguistic and religious composition
According to the latest 2011 census data, the individuals declared their ethnic identity were distributed as follows:
Bulgarians: 40,550 (91.8%)
Roma: 3,335 (7.5%)
Turks: 60 (0.1%)
Others: 199 (0.4%)
Indefinable: 280 (0.6%)
Undeclared: 3,647 (7.6%)
Total: 48,071

Tourism 

Vidin maintains two well-preserved medieval fortresses, Baba Vida and Kaleto, as well as many old Orthodox churches such as St Pantaleimon, St Petka (both 17th century), and St Dimitar (Demetrius of Thessaloniki) (19th century), the Vidin Synagogue (1894), the Osman Pazvantoğlu Mosque and library, the late 18th-century Turkish ruler of north-western Bulgaria, the Krastata Kazarma of 1798, and a number of old Renaissance buildings. Also remarkable is the theatre building which was the first Bulgarian theatre in "European model" and was built in 1891. The Vidin Synagogue built in 1894 was in 2021 a shell of its former self; plans are made to turn it into an interfaith cultural center; the Jews of Vidin number about a dozen

Another tourist attraction in the Vidin area is the town of Belogradchik, famous for its unique and impressive rock formations, the Belogradchik Rocks and the medieval Belogradchik Fortress and also the nearby Magura Cave  with its beautiful prehistoric cave paintings.

Transportation 

In Vidin is a border-station to neighbouring Romania via the Danube river. It was operated by ferryboats only until 14 June 2013 when the Vidin–Calafat Bridge opened. Crossing by ferry was possible only every  hour with just five trucks per ferry. Ticket prices were €50 per truck and €12 per car.

There are, however, state development plans to rebuild and restore the activity of Vidin airport.

Landmarks
Close to the town lies a powerful medium wave broadcasting station (since 1973) whose signals can be easily received throughout Europe. It works on 576 kHz and on 1224 kHz with a power of 500 kW each. For transmission on 576 kHz a  guyed mast equipped with a cage antenna at its lower part is used. The transmission of 576 kHz Radio Hristo Botev is on hold for now, because of the world financial crisis and it is unknown when it will resume broadcasting. A powerful FM transmitter on 88.2 MHz provides good coverage for Hristo Botev radio. Only 1224 kHz Radio Bulgaria remains atm. For the transmission on 1224 kHz four guyed masts, insulated against ground, which are each equipped with a cage antenna are used, which allows a switchable directional pattern.

Honour 
Vidin Heights on Livingston Island in the South Shetland Islands, Antarctica is named after Vidin.

Gallery

International relations

Twin towns — sister cities
Vidin is twinned with:

 Calafat, Romania
 Demre, Turkey
 Hódmezővásárhely, Hungary
 Rivne, Ukraine
 West Carrollton, United States
 Zaječar, Serbia

Partner towns
Partner towns of Vidin:

 Debar, North Macedonia
 Deggendorf, Germany
 Lecco, Italy
 Ulm, Germany

Consulate
 Honorary Consulate of Romania

Sports 

The football team of the town (FC Bdin) was established in 1923.

References

External links

 The Information Web Portal of Vidin 
 Pictures Of Baba Vida
 Old Pictures From Vidin
 
 Vidin info
 Vidin article at Pictures of Bulgaria
 Vidin photo gallery 
 All About Vidin
 Pictures of Vidin Broadcasting Station

 
Former capitals of Bulgaria
Populated places in Vidin Province
Port cities and towns in Bulgaria
Populated places on the Danube
Bulgaria–Romania border crossings
Dacia Ripensis